CIEC stands for:
 California Inland Empire Council, a council of the Boy Scouts of America
 International Commission on Civil Status, Commission internationale de l'état civil